Showpeople is the debut album by UK singer Mari Wilson. It was released in 1983 and featured her breakthrough hit "Just What I Always Wanted".

Background 

In early 1982, Wilson had achieved minor success with two singles, "Beat the Beat" and "Baby It's True", but it was in September that she broke through to top ten success when "Just What I Always Wanted" became a No.8 hit. The song sparked media interest in Wilson due to her 1960s image (in particular her beehive hairstyle) and retro sound. She was also keen to promote her backing band, The Wilsations, who received joint credit on the album. This was followed up with the more modest hit "(Beware) Boyfriend", but a cover of "Cry Me a River" returned her to the top 30. Alongside this fifth single came the debut album, which also charted well, by reaching No.24 in the UK. One more single was released from the album afterwards; "Wonderful (To Be With)", which proved to be Wilson's final top 75 entry.

The album was released in three different versions - the UK edition, a slightly modified version in Europe and a truncated version in the US. The UK edition featured neither "(Beware) Boyfriend" or "Baby It's True", while none of them included "Beat the Beat".  In the US, the album was issued in 1983 on Polygram Records and was released alongside lead single "Just What I Always Wanted", but was unsuccessful. In the UK, Showpeople remains her only hit album.

The album has never been released on Compact disc, but in 2007, all tracks were featured on Wilson's compilation album, The Platinum Collection.

Track listing 
All tracks composed by Teddy Johns; except where indicated.

UK edition 
Side One 
 "Wonderful (To Be With)" (4.35)
 "The End of the Affair" (5.16)
 "One Day Is a Lifetime" (4.28)
 "Dr Love" (3.30)
 "Remember Me" (3.46)
 "Cry Me a River" (Arthur Hamilton) (3.26)
Side Two
 "Just What I Always Wanted" (3.29)
 "This Time Tomorrow" (Tot Taylor) (3.01)
 "Are You There (With Another Girl)" (Burt Bacharach, Hal David) (4.40)
 "I May Be Wrong" (3.21)
 "Ecstasy" (3.40)
 "This Is It?" (6.01)

European edition 
Side one
 "Just What I Always Wanted"
 "The End of the Affair"
 "Are You There (With Another Girl)"
 "Dr Love"
 "Remember Me"
 "Cry Me a River"
Side two
 "Wonderful (To Be With)"
 "This Time Tomorrow"
 "One Day Is a Lifetime"
 "I May Be Wrong"
 "(Beware) Boyfriend" (4.58)
 "This Is It?"

US edition 
Side one
 "Just What I Always Wanted"
 "The End of the Affair"
 "One Day Is a Lifetime"
 "Baby It's True" (4.35)
 "Ecstacy"
Side two
 "Wonderful (To Be With)"
 "Dr Love"
 "(Beware) Boyfriend"
 "Are You There (With Another Girl)"
 "Cry Me a River"

Personnel 
Tony Mansfield - producer
 Andrew Powell - producer and arrangement on "Cry Me a River"
Teddy Johns - string arrangements
Tommy Masefield - programmer
Colin Ryan - guitar, bass
Mark Cunningham - bass
Paul Bultitude - drums
Keith Airey - strums and lead guitar
Rocky Holman - piano
Tot Taylor - backing vocals, piano, vibraphone, harp, clavichord, percussion, samples
Stewart Curtis - saxophone
Oscar Morse - saxophone
Lester Moses - saxophone on "Dr. Love"
Christopher Smith - trumpet, flugelhorn
Anne Stephenson, Virginia Hewes - violin
Hank B Hive, Jenny Hallet, John Cogan, Jules Fordham, Mari Wilson, Melvyn J Taub - backing vocals

References 

1983 debut albums
Mari Wilson albums
London Records albums
PolyGram albums